Clifford William Robinson (September 1, 1866 – July 27, 1944) was a New Brunswick lawyer, businessman and politician, the 12th premier of New Brunswick.

He was born in Moncton, New Brunswick and was educated in Point de Bute, Saint John and Moncton before attending Mount Allison University. Robinson worked as a bookkeeper from 1886 to 1889 before studying law. He was called to the bar in 1892 and set up practice in Moncton. In 1897 he became both mayor of Moncton and a member of the provincial House of Assembly as a Liberal. He served as Speaker and Provincial Secretary before becoming Premier in 1907. The Liberals had been in power since 1883, however, and voters opted for a change in the 1908 election which brought the Conservatives to power. Robinson continued in the legislature as an opposition MLA.

When the Liberals returned to power in 1917, Robinson became minister without portfolio and then Minister of Lands and Mines in the governments of Walter E. Foster and Peter J. Veniot until 1924 when he was appointed to the Senate of Canada by Prime Minister William Lyon Mackenzie King.

Robinson was the main shareholder and, for a time, president for the Moncton Transcript. He also helped establish a French language newspaper l'Acadien. He was president or director for a number of businesses in the Moncton area, helped found the Central Trust Company Limited and the Petitcodiac Hydro Development Company and also helped establish Moncton radio station CKCW.

He died in office in Montreal at the age of 77.

References 

 Hon. C.W. Robinson Government of New Brunswick biography

External links
 

1866 births
1944 deaths
Canadian Methodists
Mount Allison University alumni
Lawyers in New Brunswick
Businesspeople from New Brunswick
Canadian newspaper publishers (people)
Premiers of New Brunswick
New Brunswick Liberal Association MLAs
Members of the Executive Council of New Brunswick
Speakers of the Legislative Assembly of New Brunswick
Mayors of Moncton
19th-century Methodists
Canadian senators from New Brunswick